Anders Sandøe Ørsted (21 December 1778 – 1 May 1860) was a Danish lawyer, politician and jurist. He served as the Prime Minister of Denmark in 1853–1854.

Biography
He studied philosophy and law at the University of Copenhagen and was admitted to the bar in 1799. He became a noted jurist. An early case overseen by him was that of Hans Jonatan, an escaped slave, which was (at least viewed retrospectively) a major test case in Danish law on slavery; Anders condemned Hans to be returned to the West Indies, where he had been purchased (Hof-og Stadsret: Generalmajorinde Henriette de Schimmelmann contra mulatten Hans Jonathan 1802). 

Relatively early, he was connected to the national administration, and from 1825 to 1848, he was “generalprokurør” (juridical adviser of the government). He drew up the constitution which was granted in 1831. He was cabinet minister 1842–48, and from October 1853 to December 1854 was prime minister. He was forced to resign from his office as prime minister by his unpopular conservatism, a distinct departure from his earlier politics. In 1855, he was  impeached on the charge of breaking the constitution, but he was acquitted and retired to private life.

Analysis
He is considered one of the most important jurists in 19th century Danish legal history. He was a pioneer of connecting jurisprudence and practice, and both as a judge and as an author, he successfully worked on making practice the foundation of legislation.

His political career was one of paradoxes. As a royal councillor of the absolute monarchy, he was rather liberal and tolerant and therefore often unpopular with the more conservative elements. As the opposition grew stronger however, he became more conservative and as prime minister, he was considered a full-blood reactionary. His attempt to charter a very conservative constitution led to cooperation between the king and the liberals that forced him to resign.

Literary works
Throughout his career Ørsted was a prolific writer. Among other things he wrote on Kantian and Hegelian philosophy, on Danish and Norwegian law, on Scandinavian politics (1857) and left an autobiography (1856). He was also the editor of several journals, most notable Juridisk Arkiv (1804-1812), Nyt Juridisk Arkiv (1812-1830) and Juridisk Tidsskrift (1820-1840), as well as the official government periodical publication Collegial-Tidende (1815-34 co-edited with Peter Johan Monrad, and exclusively by Ørsted 1834–1848).

Family
He was the brother of noted physicist Hans Christian Ørsted (1777–1851), and uncle of the botanist Anders Sandøe Ørsted (1816–1872).
He was married to Sophie  Ørsted née Oehlenschläger (1782–1818) and was the brother-in-law of Adam Oehlenschläger.

References

Other sources
Dansk Biografisk Leksikon, vol. 16, 1984.
Svend Thorsen: De danske ministerier, vol 1., Copenh. 1967.

List of Danish Prime Ministers Since 1848

1778 births
1860 deaths
19th-century Danish jurists
19th-century Danish lawyers
19th-century Danish politicians
People from Langeland Municipality
Danish Interior Ministers
Danish Kultus Ministers
Prime Ministers of Denmark
Members of the Landsting (Denmark)
University of Copenhagen alumni
Members of the Constituent Assembly of Denmark